Hamilton Township may refer to:

Canada
Hamilton Township, Ontario

United States

Arkansas
 Hamilton Township, Lonoke County, Arkansas

Illinois
 Hamilton Township, Lee County, Illinois

Indiana
 Hamilton Township, Delaware County, Indiana
 Hamilton Township, Jackson County, Indiana
 Hamilton Township, Sullivan County, Indiana

Iowa
 Hamilton Township, Decatur County, Iowa
 Hamilton Township, Franklin County, Iowa
 Hamilton Township, Hamilton County, Iowa

Michigan
 Hamilton Township, Clare County, Michigan
 Hamilton Township, Gratiot County, Michigan
 Hamilton Township, Van Buren County, Michigan

Missouri
 Hamilton Township, Caldwell County, Missouri
 Hamilton Township, Harrison County, Missouri, in Harrison County, Missouri

Nebraska
 Hamilton Township, Fillmore County, Nebraska

New Jersey
 Hamilton Township, Atlantic County, New Jersey
 Hamilton Township, Mercer County, New Jersey

North Carolina
 Hamilton Township, Martin County, North Carolina, in Martin County, North Carolina

North Dakota
 Hamilton Township, Pembina County, North Dakota, in Pembina County, North Dakota

Ohio
 Hamilton Township, Butler County, Ohio, defunct
 Hamilton Township, Franklin County, Ohio
 Hamilton Township, Jackson County, Ohio
 Hamilton Township, Lawrence County, Ohio
 Hamilton Township, Warren County, Ohio

Pennsylvania
 Hamilton Township, Adams County, Pennsylvania
 Hamilton Township, Franklin County, Pennsylvania
 Hamilton Township, McKean County, Pennsylvania
 Hamilton Township, Monroe County, Pennsylvania
 Hamilton Township, Tioga County, Pennsylvania
 Hamilton Village, Philadelphia

South Dakota
 Hamilton Township, Charles Mix County, South Dakota, in Charles Mix County, South Dakota
 Hamilton Township, Marshall County, South Dakota, in Marshall County, South Dakota

Township name disambiguation pages